Levni may refer to:

Levni Yilmaz (born 1973), American independent animated film maker, artist and publisher
Abdulcelil Levni (died 1732), Ottoman Turkish painter and miniaturist
Leuni, an ancient Celtic tribe of Gallaecia

Turkish-language surnames
Turkish masculine given names